UnipolSai Assicurazioni S.p.A. is an Italian financial services company based in Bologna and founded in 2014. It is part of Unipol Group.

History
On 6 January 2014 the companies Unipol Assicurazioni, Milano Assicurazioni and Premafin (a holding company related to Fondiaria-Sai) were absorbed into Fondiaria-Sai, with the company was relocated to Bologna and renamed to UnipolSai.

The company is one of the biggest in Italy, particularly active in the insurance sector in the life, property and in the auto where in Italy is the leader with over 16.7 million of customers.

The company is listed on the Borsa Italiana and is a constituent of the FTSE MIB index.

References

External links

Italian companies established in 2014
Financial services companies established in 2014
Insurance companies of Italy
Unipol Group